The bidding process for the UEFA Euro 2020 is the process by which the location for the 16th European Championship, commonly referred to as Euro 2020, was selected. The process officially began on 21 March 2012 with the intent to announce the hosts in late 2013 or early 2014. Despite interest from Turkey, a joint bid from Scotland, the Republic of Ireland and Wales and a proposal from Georgia and Azerbaijan, UEFA announced on 6 December 2012 that it had made the unprecedented decision to host the tournament in multiple cities across Europe.

Background
Euro 2020 (held in 2021 due to the COVID-19 pandemic) was the second tournament to involve 24 nations, following UEFA Euro 2016 five years previously.

Initial bidding process
It was initially envisaged that the tournament would be contained within one, two or three countries. In the case of multiple countries hosting the tournament, these countries would have to share a border. Assuming no changes from the Euro 2016 bidding process, the basic hosting requirements were to be as follows:

 Only the 54 football associations affiliated to UEFA were eligible to host the tournament.
 Joint bids by two member associations were permitted and, under exceptional circumstances, joint bids by three member associations may have been considered.
 The stadium requirements for Euro 2016 were as set out below. However, Euro 2016 now used ten stadiums rather than the nine initially specified, so the 2020 bidding process could have adopted a new formula.
 2 stadiums with 50,000 seats 
 3 stadiums with 40,000 seats 
 4 stadiums with 30,000 seats

Schedule
On 21 March 2012, UEFA announced that the bidding process would be as set out below in the event that more than one expression of interest in bidding was received by UEFA before 15 May 2012. Without a second bid, UEFA stated that the hosts would be confirmed on 15 May, subject to the confederation receiving the necessary guarantees. On 16 May 2012, UEFA announced that, because more than one national association had submitted their interest, it would begin its formal selection process and would allow any of the 54 national federations to bid, even if they chose not to declare an interest prior to the deadline. The timeline for the rest of the procedure was announced by UEFA on 30 June 2012.

Expressions of interest
Turkey, a joint Scottish, Irish and Welsh bid and an Azerbaijani-Georgian bid all formally confirmed their interest in hosting Euro 2020 with UEFA in the spring of 2012. The deadline for declarations of interest was at midnight on 15 May 2012, but UEFA announced that further bids were welcome on 16 May.

By and large, this was seen as a disappointing group of hosts to select from, especially as favourite for the bid Turkey favoured a bid to host the 2020 Summer Olympics in its largest city Istanbul, held in the same year and seen as an obstacle to the hosting of Euro 2020. UEFA President Michel Platini was previously reported to have promised the tournament to Turkey.

The Celtic (Scotland, Republic of Ireland and Wales) bid was a late bid that arose after the lack of interest throughout the rest of Europe, Turkey aside.

The Azerbaijani-Georgian coalition was doubted by some due to Azerbaijan's preference for a successful Baku bid for the 2020 Summer Olympics. On 15 May 2012, hours after the announcement of the three-way Irish, Scottish and Welsh bid, Georgian Sports Minister Vladimir Vardzelashvili announced his country's intention to declare an interest in hosting Euro 2020 alone. Nine days later, however, Azerbaijan notified UEFA that they planned to join forces with Georgia in a bid for Euro 2020 after Baku failed to make the IOC's shortlist as a contender to bid for the 2020 Olympic Games.

Several other nations made a less committed effort to the host the tournament, but never announced a firm interest. Among these were Belgium, a joint Bosnia and Herzegovina–Croatia–Serbia bid, a proposal from Romania alongside either Bulgaria or Hungary and sole bids from Germany and the Netherlands.

Change to pan-European tournament format
On 30 June 2012, at a press conference a day before the UEFA Euro 2012 Final, UEFA President Michel Platini suggested that instead of having one host country (or joint hosting by multiple countries), Euro 2020 may be spread over "12 or 13 cities" across the continent. A similar system was in use for its male and female under-age competitions. On 6 December 2012, UEFA announced that the 2020 championships would be held in multiple cities all over Europe to mark 60 years of the tournament's existence. Platini reasoned that this was the logical decision at a time of financial difficulty across Europe.

Schedule of process
28 March 2013: Approval of the bidding requirements and bid regulations
26 April 2013: Publication of the bid regulations, bid requirements and launch of the bidding phase 
12 September 2013: Formal confirmation of candidate cities by their respective football associations
20 September 2013: Announcement of candidate cities by the UEFA Executive Committee
25 April 2014: Submission of bid dossiers 
19 September 2014: Appointment of the host cities by the UEFA Executive Committee

Venue selection
On 25 January 2013, the UEFA Executive Committee approved the principles of venue selection:
Twelve cities will host four matches (the "Standard Package"), consisting of three group stage matches and one round of 16/quarter-final match. A 13th city will host the semi-finals and final (the "Finals Package"). Each city will use one venue only. Each association could bid for either or both of the above packages (same city or two different cities). However, a maximum of one city per country will be chosen.
The minimum stadium capacities should be 70,000 for semi-finals/final, 60,000 for quarter-finals, and 50,000 for round of 16 and group matches. Up to two exceptions would be allowed for stadiums of a minimum capacity of 30,000, limited to group matches and a round of 16 match. Any projected stadiums had to start construction by 2016.
For the group stage, a maximum of two host teams will be drawn into each group, with each qualified host team guaranteed to play two home matches in the group stage. However, there was no guarantee that a host team will play any knockout matches at home. The composition of teams in the group stage would still be subject to seeding and draw, but the allocation of host teams to each group would take into account of travel distances (flights between host cities in the same group could not exceed two hours).
Each team which qualified for the finals could set up their base camp anywhere, without any obligation of staying in any of the host countries.
Each host city had to have two airports, or two separate airport terminals at a single airport. This was to segregate rival fans.

In May 2013, UEFA President Michel Platini announced that his personal priority was to have the competition hosted at venues that have never hosted European Championship matches before.

Expressions of interest
The deadline for expressions of interest was 12 September 2013. On 20 September, UEFA confirmed expressions of interest from 32 football associations to act as host cities. Of the associations which had applied to host matches at Euro 2020, nineteen had not previously hosted the final stages of tournament, (labeled with *). Whilst neither Croatia or Serbia had hosted an international football tournament as independent countries, the Serbian and Croatian capitals both hosted finals matches for Euro 1976 as part of then Yugoslavia. 

Expressed interest in bidding for Finals Package and Standard Package

Brussels – proposed new national stadium (potentially 60,000)
 
London – Wembley Stadium (90,000)

Munich – Allianz Arena (67,812)

Madrid – Metropolitano Stadium (20,000, to be expanded up to 70,000)
Barcelona – RCDE Stadium (40,500)
Bilbao – San Mamés Barria (53,332)
Valencia – Nou Mestalla (75,100; under construction)
*
Cardiff – Millennium Stadium (74,500)
Expressed interest in bidding for Finals Package
*
Istanbul – Atatürk Olympic Stadium (76,092)

Kyiv – NSK Olimpiyskiy (70,050) for semi-finals/final
Expressed interest in bidding for Standard Package
*
Yerevan – Hrazdan Stadium (54,208)
*
Baku – Baku Olympic Stadium (68,000; under construction)
*
Minsk – Traktor Stadium (proposed renovation; to be expanded up to 33,000)
*
Sofia – Vasil Levski National Stadium (43,230)

Zagreb – proposed new national stadium (55,000)
Split – Stadion Poljud (to be expanded to 50,000)
*
Prague – proposed new national stadium
*
Copenhagen – Parken Stadium (38,065)
*
Helsinki – Helsinki Olympic Stadium (37,500)

Lyon – Parc Olympique Lyonnais (61,556)
*
Athens – Olympic Stadium (75,263)
*
Budapest – Puskás Aréna (proposed new 67,889 stadium)
*
Dublin – Aviva Stadium (51,700)
*
Jerusalem – Teddy Stadium (to be expanded to 53,000)

Rome – Stadio Olimpico (72,698)
Milan – San Siro (80,018)
*
Astana – Astana Arena (30,000)
*
Skopje – Philip II Arena (33,460)
 
Amsterdam – Amsterdam Arena (53,052; to be expanded to 55–56,000)

Warsaw – National Stadium (58,145)
Chorzów – Stadion Śląski (54,477)

Lisbon – Estádio da Luz (65,647)
Porto – Estádio do Dragão (50,399)
*
Bucharest – Arena Națională (55,600)
*
Saint Petersburg – Krestovsky Stadium (69,500)
*
Glasgow – Hampden Park (52,063)

Belgrade – Red Star Stadium (55,538) or proposed new national stadium

Solna, Stockholm – Friends Arena (50,000)

Basel – St. Jakob-Park (38,512)

Donetsk – Donbass Arena (52,518)

Withdrawn interest
The Finnish Football Association withdrew its bid on 4 March 2014 as redevelopments to its chosen venue, the Helsinki Olympic Stadium, will leave it below the standards required to host matches at the tournament. The Czech Football Association also withdrew its candidacy in March 2014 citing that the government was not ready to provide the guarantees for building a new stadium.

The Italian Football Federation withdrew Milan's San Siro Stadium after selecting Rome's Stadio Olimpico as the country's sole venue to host Euro 2020 matches.

Several federations withdrew their bids in late April 2014, before the final dossiers were submitted on 25 April. Four nations who had hosted recent tournaments – Euro 2008 hosts Switzerland (St. Jakob-Park, Basel), Euro 2012 co-hosts Poland (National Stadium, Warsaw and Silesian Stadium, Chorzów) and Ukraine (Olympic Stadium, Kyiv), and Euro 2016 hosts France (Stade des Lumières, Lyon) – withdrew after deciding that their chances of success were minimal. Despite being favourites to host the final, Turkey withdrew its bid to host the final at the Atatürk Olympic Stadium in Istanbul in favour of bidding to host UEFA Euro 2024.

In addition, other withdrawn bids included: both Portuguese bids, at the Estádio da Luz and Estádio do Dragão, due to lack of support from local councils; the bid from the Czech Football Association in Prague due to lack of financial guarantees from city authorities; the Croatian Football Federation's bid in Zagreb, due to financial problems; Armenia; Greece; Kazakhstan; and Serbia.

Bidding venues

The final list of bids was published by UEFA on 26 April 2014 with a decision on the hosts to be made by the UEFA Executive Committee on 19 September 2014. There were two bids for the Finals Package (of which one was successful, marked with blue colour for Semi-Finals and Final) and 19 bids for the Standard Package (of which 12 were initially successful, marked with green colour for Quarter-Finals and Group Stage, yellow colour for Round of 16 and Group Stage; Brussels, marked with red, were initially selected but removed from the list of venues by UEFA on 7 December 2017).

On 10 September 2014, UEFA published the evaluation reports of the 19 bids. Before the voting on 19 September 2014, UEFA judged that the candidatures of Belarus (Minsk), Bulgaria (Sofia), Macedonia (Skopje) and Israel (Jerusalem) did not fulfill the bid requirements, so they did not participate at all in the selection phases.

Voting

Procedure
The voting procedure of the venues was approved by the UEFA Executive Committee on 13 May 2014:
In the first voting phase, the winner of the Finals Package would be selected.
In the second voting phase, the winners of the four Standard Packages which would host the quarter-finals would be selected.
In the third and fourth voting phases, the winners of the eight Standard Packages which would host the round of 16 matches would be selected. This selection would be based on "regional zones" which would be finalized by the end of August 2014 by UEFA Executive Committee members whose associations were not bidding.
In the third phase, for each zone that had not been selected in the first two phases, a winner of the Standard Package would be selected.
In the fourth phase, the winners of the remaining Standard Packages would be selected.
The voting was done by secret ballot and Executive Committee members which were associated with the bidding associations were not allowed to vote.

The announcement ceremony of the selected venues took place at the Espace Hippomène in Geneva on 19 September 2014, 13:00 CEST, right after the voting in the morning.

Summary

The 13 venues were selected and announced on 19 September 2014:
Final and Semi-finals: London (England)
Quarter-finals and Group stage: Munich (Germany), Baku (Azerbaijan), Saint Petersburg (Russia), Rome (Italy)
Round of 16 and Group Stage: Copenhagen (Denmark), Bucharest (Romania), Amsterdam (Netherlands), Dublin (Republic of Ireland), Bilbao (Spain), Budapest (Hungary), Brussels (Belgium), Glasgow (Scotland)
Since Minsk, Sofia, Skopje and Jerusalem did not fulfill UEFA's requirements, Cardiff and Stockholm were the only cities not selected among the eligible bids.

First phase
In the first phase, the venue which will host the semi-finals and final was selected. Munich withdrew prior to the vote, and London was selected by acclamation.

Second phase
In the second phase, the four venues which will host one quarter-final and three group stage matches were selected. The seven candidate venues with a capacity of at least 60,000 were eligible. Each voting member ranked the venues in their order of preference: four points for their first choice, three points for their second choice, two points for their third choice, and one point for their fourth choice. The four venues with the highest points total were selected.

Third phase
In the third phase, a venue from each of the geographical zones which had not yet been chosen was selected to host a round of 16 match and three group stage matches. The six geographical zones were:
Zone 1 (North-West): England, Republic of Ireland, Scotland, Wales
Zone 2 (Scandinavia): Denmark, Sweden
Zone 3 (East): Azerbaijan, Belarus, Russia
Zone 4 (Centre-East): Bulgaria, Macedonia, Hungary, Romania
Zone 5 (Centre): Belgium, Germany, Netherlands
Zone 6 (South-Mediterranean): Italy, Israel, Spain
Prior to the vote, the venues of Belarus (Minsk), Bulgaria (Sofia), Macedonia (Skopje), and Israel (Jerusalem) were determined to have failed bid requirements, and thus were not involved in the final two phases.

Of the six zones, Zones 1, 3, 5 and 6 already had venues chosen in the first two phases. Therefore, only Zones 2 and 4 were involved in this phase.

Fourth phase
In the fourth phase, the six remaining venues which would host one round of 16 and three group stage matches were selected among the remaining candidate venues. Each voting member ranked the venues in their order of preference: six points for their first choice, five points for their second choice, four points for their third choice, three points for their fourth choice, two points for their fifth choice, and one point for their sixth choice. The six venues with the highest points total were selected.

Selected venues
Below were the initial 13 venues selected by UEFA. However, the UEFA Executive Committee removed Brussels as a host city on 7 December 2017 due to delays with the building of the Eurostadium. The four matches (three group stage, one round of 16) initially scheduled to be held in Brussels were instead allocated to London. Therefore, London now hosted a total of seven matches, as the city was already chosen to host the semi-finals and final of the tournament. On 23 April 2021, UEFA announced that due to a lack of guarantees regarding spectators caused by the COVID-19 pandemic, Dublin was removed as a tournament host (with their matches reallocated to Saint Petersburg for the group stage and London for the round of 16). Similarly, UEFA reassigned the four matches in Spain elsewhere in the country, with La Cartuja in Seville replacing Bilbao.

References

External links
UEFA Euro 2020 – Information at Union of European Football Associations

UEFA Euro 2020
2020
Belgium at UEFA Euro 2020
Denmark at UEFA Euro 2020
England at UEFA Euro 2020
Germany at UEFA Euro 2020
Italy at UEFA Euro 2020
Netherlands at UEFA Euro 2020
North Macedonia at UEFA Euro 2020
Russia at UEFA Euro 2020
Spain at UEFA Euro 2020
Sweden at UEFA Euro 2020
Wales at UEFA Euro 2020